Acraea conradti is a butterfly in the family Nymphalidae. It is found in Tanzania (from the north-east to the Usambara Mountains) and Mozambique.

Description

A. conradti Oberth. (56 f) differs from all the preceding similarly coloured and marked species [members of the Acraea masamba species group.]  in having the apical half of the forewing densely scaled without vitreous spot in 3 but with sharply defined white spots in 4 to 6 and especially in having the veins of the hindwing beneath broadly black at the distal margin and the streaks short and thickened, coniform. Nyassaland and German East Africa.

Taxonomy
It is a member of the Acraea circeis species group- but see also Pierre & Bernaud, 2014

References

External links

Images representing Acraea conradti at Bold
Images representing Acraea conradti vumbui at Bold

Butterflies described in 1893
conradti
Butterflies of Africa